Casiri may refer to:
 Casiri (Arequipa), a mountain in Arequipa Region, Peru
 Casiri (Tacna), a volcano in Tacna Region, Peru

People with the surname
 Miguel Casiri (1710–1791), Lebanese Orientalist

See also
 Kasiri, an alcoholic beverage made from cassava
 Q'asiri (disambiguation)